Villa del Rosario is the name of several places:
 Villa del Rosario, Córdoba, Argentina
 Villa del Rosario, Entre Ríos, Argentina
 Villa del Rosario, the former name of present-day Rosario, Santa Fe, Argentina
 Villa del Rosario, Norte de Santander, Colombia
 Villa del Rosario, Paraguay, San Pedro, Paraguay
 Villa del Rosario, Uruguay, village in Lavalleja Department, Uruguay
 La Villa del Rosario, Venezuela